Sir Antony James Zacaroli, styled Mr Justice Zacaroli, is a British High Court judge.

Early life and education 
Zacaroli was born in Sutton Coldfield and attended the local comprehensive school, Bishop Walsh Academy.

He went on to study law at Pembroke College, Oxford, graduating in 1982. He was a tutor at Pembroke from 1987 to 1991.

In 2018, Zacaroli was elected as an Honorary Fellow of Pembroke College, Oxford where he leads seminars to Law Students.

Career 
Zacaroli was called to the Bar by Middle Temple in 1987. After completing his pupillage he practised at a chancery chambers in Middle Temple. 

He later moved to South Square Chambers in 1990 until his appointment as a Judge in 2017. During his tenancy, he specialised in insolvency, banking and commercial law. 

Whilst practising at the Bar, Zacaroli was a member of a number of committees. He served on the Management Committee of the Bar Pro Bono Unit since 2001, the Insolvency Rules Committee since 2012 and since 2015, the Financial Markets Law Committee.

He was appointed King's Counsel in 2006.

On the 16th of July 2013, Zacaroli was appointed as an Ordinary Bencher for Middle Temple.

Zacaroli would be appointed as a High Court judge on the 13th of November 2017 and assigned to the Chancery division by the Lord Chief Justice He later received his customary Knighthood from Elizabeth II on the 6th of December, 2018.

References 

21st-century English judges

Alumni of Pembroke College, Oxford

Living people

Year of birth missing (living people)
People from Sutton Coldfield